The Annual Workshop on Formal Approaches to Slavic Linguistics (often abbreviated FASL) is one of the most reputable international academic conferences in the field of formal Slavic linguistics. Each meeting is hosted by a United States or Canada university in May. From the beginning through FASL 27, the proceedings were published by Michigan Slavic Publications of University of Michigan in Ann Arbor, MI. From FASL 28 on, the proceedings are published as an extra issue of Journal of Slavic Linguistics.

Hosts and invited speakers
I 1992 University of Michigan
II 1993 Massachusetts Institute of Technology
III 1994 University of Maryland, College Park
IV 1995 Cornell University
V 1996 Indiana University (Bloomington) & Wabash College
VI 1997 University of Connecticut
 Christina Bethin, Howard Lasnik, Steven Franks
VII 1998 University of Washington
VIII 1999 University of Pennsylvania
 Greville Corbett, Anthony Kroch, Draga Zec
IX 2000 Indiana University (Bloomington)
 Wayles Browne, Liljana Progovac
X 2001 University of Michigan
XI 2002 University of Massachusetts Amherst
 Maria-Luisa Rivero, Yakov Testelets, Ellen Woolford
XII 2003 University of Ottawa
 Robert D. Borsley, John F. Bailyn, Helen Goodluck
XIII 2004 University of South Carolina
 Leonard H. Babby, Christina Bethin, Roumyana Slabakova
XIV 2005 Princeton University
XV 2006 University of Toronto
 Catherine Rudin, Željko Bošković
XVI 2007 State University of New York at Stony Brook
 David Pesetsky, Maria Polinsky, Jerzy Rubach
XVII 2008 Yale University
 Alexei Kochetov, Liljana Progovac, Draga Zec
XVIII 2009 Cornell University
 Invited speakers: Barbara Citko, Molly Diesing, Jaye Padgett
XIX 2010 University of Maryland, College Park
 Invited speakers: Hana Filip, James Lavine, Juan Uriagereka
XX 2011 Massachusetts Institute of Technology
 Invited speakers: Ivona Kučerová, Donca Steriade, Sergei Tatevosov, Morris Halle
XXI 2012 Indiana University, Bloomington
 Invited speakers: Željko Bošković, Guglielmo Cinque and Iliana Krapova, Damir Cavar, Tania Ionin
XXII 2013 McMaster University
 Invited speakers: Maria Gouskova, Roumyana Pancheva, David Pesetsky
 XXIII 2014 University of California, Berkeley
 Barbara Citko, Greville Corbett, Johanna Nichols, Jerzy Rubach
 XXIV 2015 New York University
 Morphology Workshop: Vera Gribanova, Ora Matushansky, Katya Pertsova; Main sessions: John Frederick Bailyn, Christina Bethin, Maria Polinsky
 XXV 2016 Cornell University
 Michael Becker, Gaja Jarosz, Catherine Rudin
 XXVI 2017 University of Illinois at Urbana-Champaign
 Stephanie Harves, Darya Kavitskaya, Alexandra Perovic, Irina Sekerina, Natalia Slioussar
 XXVII 2018 Stanford University
 Maria Gouskova, Ivona Kučerová, Roumyana Pancheva
 XXVIII 2019 Stony Brook University
 Draga Zec, Greville Corbett, Steven Franks
 XXIX 2020 University of Washington Peter Jurgec, Asya Pereltsvaig, Liljana Progovac.
 XXX 2021 Massachusetts Institute of Technology
 Paulina Lyskawa, Ekaterina Lyutikova, Radek Šimík, Aida Talić
 XXXI 2022 McMaster University
 John Frederick Bailyn, Tanya Bondarenko, Veno Volenec, Neda Todorović

References

External links
Proceedings
FASL XVI
FASL XVII
FASL XVIII
FASL XIX
FASL XX
FASL XXI
FASL XXII
FASL XXIV (backup)

Slavic studies
Academic conferences
Recurring events established in 1992
International conferences in the United States
International conferences in Canada